Sudan is a multilingual country dominated by Sudanese Arabic. In the 2005 constitution of the Republic of Sudan, the official languages of Sudan are Arabic and English.

An endangered language is a language that it is at risk of falling out of use, generally because it has few surviving speakers. If it loses all of its native speakers, it becomes an extinct language.

Sudan

References

 Sudan
Lists of languages
Globalization-related lists